Choi Myung-soo (born January 12, 1968), better known by his stage name Choi Moo-sung, is a South Korean actor.

Filmography

Film

Television series

Awards and nominations

References

External links
 

1968 births
Living people
People from Busan
Male actors from Busan
South Korean male stage actors
South Korean male film actors
South Korean male television actors
21st-century South Korean male actors